Robert Robinson Taylor (June 8, 1868 – December 13, 1942) was an American architect and educator. Taylor was the first African-American student enrolled at the Massachusetts Institute of Technology (MIT), and the first accredited African-American architect when he graduated in 1892. He was an early and influential member of the Tuskegee Institute faculty.

A native of Wilmington, North Carolina, Taylor remained in architectural practice in the American South for over forty years. He was part of what was possibly the nation’s first black architecture firm, Taylor and Persley, a partnership founded in July 1920 with Louis H. Persley. He designed many of the early buildings of the Tuskegee Institute, and at several other Historically black colleges and universities. As second-in-command to Booker T. Washington, the Tuskegee Institute's founder, Taylor was instrumental in both campus planning and inventing the school's industrial curriculum.

Early life
Robert Robinson Taylor was born on June 8, 1868, in Wilmington, North Carolina. His father, Henry Taylor, worked as a carpenter and businessman, born into slavery but freed in 1847 by his father and owner Angus Taylor. His mother, Emily Still, was the daughter of freedmen even prior to the Civil War. He left home for MIT in 1888, where he studied architecture. In June 1890 and again in September 1891, he was recommended for the Loring Scholarship, which he held for two consecutive academic years: 1890–1891 and 1892–1893.

During his course of study at MIT, he talked in person on more than one occasion with Booker T. Washington. What Washington had in mind was for Taylor to develop the industrial program at Tuskegee and to plan and direct the construction of new buildings for the campus. At the MIT faculty meeting on May 26, 1892, Taylor was one of twelve students in Course IV, the architectural program, recommended for a degree. The class of 1892 was the largest on record since MIT's founding. After graduation Taylor did not head directly to Tuskegee. He finally accepted the Tuskegee offer in the fall or winter of 1892.

Career

Taylor's first building project on the Tuskegee University campus was the Science Hall (Thrasher Hall) completed in 1893. The new Science Hall was constructed entirely by students, using bricks made also by students under Taylor's supervision. The project epitomized Washington's philosophy of instilling in Tuskegee students, the descendants of former enslaved Africans, the value and dignity of physical labor.  It exemplified of the capabilities of African Americans in the building trades, and it underscored the larger potential of the manual training curricula being developed at Tuskegee. A number of other buildings followed, including the original Tuskegee Chapel, erected between 1895 and 1898, and The Oaks, built in 1899 as Tuskegee's presidential residence.

From 1899 to 1902, he returned to Cleveland, Ohio, to work on his own and for the architectural firm of Charles W. Hopkinson. Upon his return to Tuskegee from Cleveland in 1902, he was architect and director of "mechanical industries" until his retirement in the mid-1930s. To develop a sound curriculum at Tuskegee, both Washington and Taylor drew inspiration from MIT as a model. Taylor's own admiration for MIT as a model for Tuskegee's development was conveyed in a speech that he delivered at MIT in 1911. Taylor cited examples to the 1911 US Congress in a paper to illustrate the kinds of rigorous ideas, approaches, and methods that Tuskegee had adopted from MIT and successfully applied within the context of a black educational institution.

Taylor also designed buildings that were not at Tuskegee. These include Carnegie libraries at Wiley College in Marshall, Texas, and at Livingstone College in Salisbury, North Carolina. With his later partner, the black architect Louis H. Persley, he did large buildings at Selma University in Selma, Alabama, and the Colored Masonic Temple, which is also an office building and entertainment venue, in Birmingham, Alabama.

He served for a period as vice-principal of Tuskegee, beginning in 1925. In 1929, under the joint sponsorship of the Phelps-Stokes Fund, the Liberian government, and Firestone Rubber, he went to Kakata, Liberia to lay out architectural plans and devise a program in industrial training for the proposed Booker Washington Institute – "the Tuskegee of Africa." Robert Taylor served on the Mississippi Valley Flood Relief Commission, appointed by President Herbert Hoover, and was chairman of the Tuskegee chapter of the American Red Cross.

Following his retirement to his native Wilmington, North Carolina, in 1935, the governor of North Carolina appointed Taylor to the board of trustees of what is now Fayetteville State University. Moreover, in 1942, less than a decade after his retirement from Tuskegee, he wrote to the secretary of his MIT class indicating that he had just been released from treatment for an unspecified illness at the Mayo Clinic in Rochester, Minnesota. "Thanks to a kind Providence and skillful physicians," he said, "I am much better now."

Personal life
In 1898, he married Beatrice Rochon Taylor. They had four children, one of whom, Robert Rochon Taylor, became a noted housing advocate in Chicago. Beatrice's younger sister was teacher and pharmacist Etnah Rochon Boutte. After Beatrice died in 1906, Robert remarried in 1912 to Nellie Chestnutt; they had one child.

Death
He died on December 13, 1942, while attending services in the Tuskegee Chapel, the building that he considered his most outstanding achievement as an architect. He was buried at the Pine Forest Cemetery in Wilmington, North Carolina.

Legacy
The Taylor School of Architecture and Construction Science at Tuskegee University is named for Taylor. The housing project in Chicago, Robert Taylor Homes, was named after his son, Robert Rochon Taylor, a civic leader and former Chairman of the Chicago Housing Authority.

The US Postal Service has a postage stamp with his likeness.

His great-granddaughter, Valerie Jarrett, was a senior advisor to Former President Barack Obama.

Projects

Huntington Hall (1900)
Emery dormitories 4 buildings (1900)
Dorothy Hall (1901) Tuskegee Institute
Women's Trades Building (1901)
Carnegie Library (1901)
Administration Building (1902–03)
Rockefeller Hall (1903)
Men's residence Hall (1904)
Douglass Hall (1904)
Collis P. Huntington Memorial Building academic building(1904–05)
Tantum Hall (1907)
Milbank Agriculture Building (1909)
Tompkins Hall, dining facility (1910)
White Hall, women's dormitory (1910)
John A. Andrew Memorial Hospital (1913)
Laundry, now The George Washington Carver Museum (1915)
James Hall (1921)
Prince Hall Masonic Temple (1924)
Sage Hall (1927)
Wilcox Trade Buildings, architecture buildings (1928)
Logan Hall, old gym (1931)
Armstrong Science Building (1932)
Hollis Burke Frissell Library (1932)

See also 

 African-American architects
 Robert Charles Bates, an early architecture teacher at Claflin University

References

External links
 Robert R. Taylor, First Black Student at MIT (MIT Black History Project)

1868 births
1942 deaths
People from Wilmington, North Carolina
MIT School of Architecture and Planning alumni
African-American architects
19th-century American architects
Fayetteville State University
Tuskegee University faculty
20th-century African-American people
20th-century American architects